Dalberg-Acton is a surname. Notable people with the surname include:
John Dalberg-Acton, 1st Baron Acton, KCVO, DL (1834–1902), English Catholic historian, politician, and writer
Ferdinand Dalberg-Acton (1801–1837), British baronet

See also
Dalberg (disambiguation)
Acton (surname)
Lyon-Dalberg-Acton

Compound surnames
Surnames of English origin
Surnames of German origin